Edward Jrbashyan (1923–1999) was an Armenian literary critic, recognized as one of the most important literary critics in Soviet Armenia. A professor at the Yerevan State University, Jrbashyan directed the Abeghian Literature Institute of the Armenian National Academy of Sciences.

He was noted for his numerous works on Armenia's national poet Hovhannes Tumanyan.

References

1923 births
1999 deaths
Armenian literary critics
Armenian male writers
Soviet literary critics

hy:Էդվարդ Ջրբաշյան